Bobby Keyes may refer to:

 Bobby Keyes (gridiron football) (born 1982), American player of Canadian football
 Bobby Keyes (guitarist), American guitarist and songwriter
 Bobby Keyes (footballer) (1910–1970), Scottish footballer (Falkirk FC)
 Bobby Keyes (rugby league), (1942–2022), Australian rugby league player

See also
 Bobby Keys (1943–2014), American rock saxophone player
 Robert Keyes (c. 1565–1606), English Gunpowder Plotter
 Robert Keyes (baseball), Negro league baseball player
 Bob Keyes (1936–1978), American football player